Thunder Bay is a large bay on the northern shore of Lake Superior, in Thunder Bay District, Ontario, Canada. It is bordered to the east by the Sibley Peninsula at the southern tip of which is Thunder Cape, marking the entrance to the bay for ships approaching from the east. The mesas and sills on the peninsula are known as the Sleeping Giant due to their appearance when viewed from Thunder Bay.

Notable islands and island chains in the bay include:
Pie Island and nearby Flatland Island
Welcome Islands
Caribou Island

Rivers emptying into the bay include the:
Kaministiquia River
Neebing River
McIntyre River
Current River
MacKenzie River (18 km east of the city)
Blende River
Wild Goose Creek
Blind Creek

The harbour at the City of Thunder Bay is Canada's westernmost port on the Great Lakes, and the end of Great Lakes navigation.

The Ojibwa called it Animikie, meaning "thunder". French explorers called it Baie du Tonnerre which was translated to Thunder Bay in English. In 1871, the bay gave its name to the newly created Thunder Bay District, and in 1970, the amalgamated city of Port Arthur and Fort William also adopted the name Thunder Bay.

Bays of Ontario
Landforms of Thunder Bay District
Bays of Lake Superior

la:Sinus Tonitralis